Kivisuo is a village in the municipality of Joutsa in middle-Finland.

It is located about 10 kilometers east from Leivonmäki. The village has a population of about 60 inhabitants.

References 

Kivisuo kansallispuistokylä - Official homepages of Kivisuo (in Finnish)

Villages in Finland
Joutsa